AeroTACA (acronym of AeroTaxi Casanare) was a airline based in Bogotá, Colombia. It operated charter flights within Colombia and to neighbouring countries. Its main base was El Dorado International Airport.

History
The airline was established and started operations in 1965 as AeroTaxi Casanare, It was wholly owned by the Urdaneta family.

In 1989, one of its planes crashed in the city of Tame when it was unable to land. After the accident, the airline's facilities were transferred to El Dorado International Airport, and its name was changed to Aerotransportes Casanare. The company was authorized to expand its routes to territories that only AIRES covered.

The airline changed its name in 1996 to AeroTACA, with the acquisition of larger aircraft. 

Since 2000, the company began to expand throughout the national territory, in addition to signing a technical support contract with the Venezuelan airline Avior Airlines. Several regional routes from ACES were also requested to operate upon entering the settlement. The company wanted to operate 11 aircraft and cover the entire Colombian territory.

Following the crash of West Caribbean Airways Flight 708 in Venezuela, the Colombian Civil Aviation Authority required that all airlines undergo a special inspection of its maintenance facilities and aircraft. AeroTACA was forced to cease operating in September 2005 after not passing any of the inspections and went into liquidation in 2006, as it was unable to remain financially stable.

Destinations

Aguachica (Hacaritama Airport)
Arauca (Santiago Pérez Quiroz Airport)
Bogota (El Dorado International Airport) Hub
Bucaramanga (Palonegro International Airport)
Cimitarra (Cimitarra Airport)
Cucuta (Camilo Daza International Airport)
Florencia (Gustavo Artunduaga Paredes Airport)
Ibague (Perales Airport)
La Pedrera (La Pedrera Airport)
Malaga (Málaga Airport)
Mitu (Fabio Alberto León Bentley Airport)
Neiva (Benito Salas Airport)
Paz de Ariporo (Paz de Ariporo Airport)
Puerto Berrio (Morela Airport)
Sabana de Torres (Las Cruces Airport)
San Gil (Los Pozos Airport)
San Jose del Guaviare (Jorge Enrique González Torres Airport)
Santa Rosa del Sur (Gabriel Antonio Caro Aerodrome)
Saravena (Los Colonizadores Airport)
Sogamoso (Alberto Lleras Camargo Airport)
Tame (Gabriel Vargas Santos Airport)
Tauramena (Tauramena Airport)
Villanueva (Villanueva Airport)
Villavicencio (La Vanguardia Airport)
Yopal (El Alcaraván Airport)

Fleet
The AeroTACA fleet includes the following aircraft:

Raytheon Beech King Air C90B
Beechcraft 1900C
Cessna 206
Cessna 404 Titan
de Havilland Canada DHC-6 Twin Otter
Fairchild Hiller FH-227
Piper PA-28
Piper PA-32
Saab 340B

See also
List of defunct airlines of Colombia

References

Defunct airlines of Colombia
Airlines established in 1965
Airlines disestablished in 2006
Defunct companies of Colombia